Megachile architecta is a species of bee in the family Megachilidae. It was described by Smith in 1857.

References

Architecta
Insects described in 1857